The A. Walsh Stone House and Farm Complex is located along NY 94 in the Orange County town of Cornwall, New York, United States. It is next to the Salisbury Mills Metro-North station and not far from the Moodna Viaduct. The center of the complex, still a working farm, is a stone Greek Revival house.

It was added to the National Register of Historic Places in 2001.

References

Houses on the National Register of Historic Places in New York (state)
Houses in Orange County, New York
National Register of Historic Places in Orange County, New York
Cornwall, New York
Greek Revival houses in New York (state)